The canton of Saint-Just-Saint-Rambert is a French administrative division located in the department of Loire and the Auvergne-Rhône-Alpes region. At the French canton reorganisation which came into effect in March 2015, the canton was expanded from 12 to 18 communes:

Aboën
Apinac
Bonson
Chambles
Estivareilles
Merle-Leignec
Périgneux
Rozier-Côtes-d'Aurec
Saint-Bonnet-le-Château
Saint-Cyprien
Saint-Hilaire-Cusson-la-Valmitte
Saint-Just-Saint-Rambert
Saint-Marcellin-en-Forez
Saint-Maurice-en-Gourgois
Saint-Nizier-de-Fornas 
Sury-le-Comtal
La Tourette
Usson-en-Forez

See also
Cantons of the Loire department

References

Cantons of Loire (department)